Dyre may refer to:

People:

Emil Dyre (born 1984), Danish professional football midfielder
Mette Dyre (c. 1465), Danish, Norwegian and Swedish noblewoman

Rapid transit:
IRT Dyre Avenue Line, a New York City Subway line
Eastchester–Dyre Avenue (IRT Dyre Avenue Line), a New York City Subway station
, a former New York City Subway service

See also
Dyer (disambiguation)